Ben A. Hill (April 22, 1892 – April 23, 1976) was an American politician who was a member of the California State Assembly for the 72nd district from 1931 to 1933. He also served in the United States Army during World War I.

References

United States Army personnel of World War I
Republican Party members of the California State Assembly
20th-century American politicians
1892 births
1976 deaths